The Latvian Sportspersonality of the Year is chosen annually since 2005, for both men and women.

Sportspersonality of the year

Titles by sport

References

External links 
 Latvian Olympic Committee

National sportsperson-of-the-year trophies and awards
Sport in Latvia
Awards established in 2005
2005 establishments in Latvia
Latvian awards